Murat Fırat (born 23 September 1997) is a Turkish Greco-Roman wrestler competing in the 67 kg division. He is a member of Ankara ASKI. He won the gold medal at the 2022 European Wrestling Championships.

Career 
Murat Fırat captured bronze medal in men's Greco-Roman 67 kg at 2021 European Wrestling Championships.

He won the gold medal in the 67 kg event at the 2022 European Wrestling Championships held in Budapest, Hungary.

Major results

References

External links 
 

1997 births
Living people
Turkish male sport wrestlers
European Wrestling Championships medalists
European Wrestling Champions
Competitors at the 2022 Mediterranean Games
Mediterranean Games medalists in wrestling
Mediterranean Games gold medalists for Turkey
21st-century Turkish people